Powhatan is an unincorporated community in McDowell County, West Virginia, United States, located approximately one mile from Northfork.

The community probably derived its name from the local Powhatan Coal Company.

References 

Unincorporated communities in McDowell County, West Virginia
Unincorporated communities in West Virginia
Coal towns in West Virginia